Lars Walther (born 15 October 1965) is a retired Danish handball player and current handball coach. He is currently coaching RK Eurofarm Pelister.

References

External links
 Profile at HBOLD.dk

1965 births
Living people
Danish male handball players
Danish handball coaches
Danish expatriate sportspeople in Romania
Expatriate handball players
Aalborg Håndbold players
Knattspyrnufélag Akureyrar handball players